The Cleveland Forest Citys were a professional baseball team based in Cleveland, Ohio for two seasons in the National Association from  to .

Keys

Players

References

External links
Franchise index at Baseball-Reference and Retrosheet

Major League Baseball all-time rosters